I Like to Watch is a music video collection by the band Crowded House, which was released in 1992 on video only. The collection features 13 promotional music videos for the singles from the band's first three albums along with three short documentary features on the band.

History
The cover artwork for the collection is by bassist Nick Seymour and features elements from the cover of the album Temple of Low Men.

Track listing

External links
Official Crowded House Website

Crowded House video albums
Music video compilation albums
1992 video albums